Jennings Township is one of nine townships in Crawford County, Indiana. As of the 2010 census, its population was 1,436 and it contained 676 housing units.

Geography
Spring Lake is in this township.

Cities and towns
 Leavenworth

Unincorporated towns
 Carefree
 Curby
 Magnolia
 Pilot Knob
 Wyandotte
(This list is based on USGS data and may include former settlements.)

Adjacent townships
 Whiskey Run Township (northeast)
 Harrison Township, Harrison County (east)
 Spencer Township, Harrison County (east)
 Ohio Township (southwest)
 Sterling Township (northwest)

Major highways
  Interstate 64
  Indiana State Road 62
  Indiana State Road 66

Cemeteries
The township contains three cemeteries: Everton, Leavenworth Memorial Garden and Old Leavenworth.

References
 
 United States Census Bureau cartographic boundary files

External links

 Indiana Township Association
 United Township Association of Indiana

Townships in Crawford County, Indiana
Townships in Indiana